The 2014 Houston Cougars football team represented the University of Houston in the 2014 NCAA Division I FBS football season. It was the 67th year of season play for Houston. The season was the second for the Cougars as a member of the American Athletic Conference and their first playing in their new stadium, TDECU Stadium in Houston. They finished the season 8–5, 5–3 in AAC play to finish in a tie for fourth place. They were invited to the Armed Forces Bowl where they defeated Pittsburgh.

On December 8, head coach Tony Levine was fired. He finished with a record of 21–17 three seasons. Defensive coordinator David Gibbs led the Cougars in the Armed Forces Bowl.

Schedule

Schedule Source:

Game summaries

UTSA
Sources:

Grambling State
Sources:

BYU
Sources:

UNLV

UCF

Memphis

Temple

South Florida

Tulane

Tulsa

SMU

Cincinnati

Pittsburgh (Armed Forces Bowl)

References

Houston
Houston Cougars football seasons
Armed Forces Bowl champion seasons
Houston Cougars football